Slate Peak is a  mountain summit located on the shared border between Okanogan County and Whatcom County in Washington state. It is part of the Okanogan Range, which is a sub-range of the North Cascades. The peak has the distinction of having the highest road in Washington, as well as the highest fire lookout. Although the narrow one-lane white-knuckle road reaches the summit of the mountain, the Forest Service gated it to vehicles, which necessitates walking the final few hundred yards. Additionally, the Pacific Crest Trail traverses the west slope of the peak, and the West Fork Pasayten Trail traverses the eastern slope. The nearest higher peak is Devils Peak,  to the north. Precipitation runoff from Slate Peak drains east into Pasayten River, or west into Slate Creek, which is in the Skagit River drainage basin.

Slate Peak Fire Lookout

The fire lookout tower was originally constructed as a gable-roof cupola in 1924. In 1956 the Air Force leveled the mountain summit by removing 40 feet from the top of the peak (as well as the lookout) in order to install a radar station, which was never built. The present lookout sits atop a 41-foot tall tower which is maintained for emergency use. The Slate Peak Lookout was added to the National Historic Lookout Register on November 4, 2000. On a clear day, visitors can see Silver Star Mountain, The Needles, Tower Mountain, Golden Horn, Azurite Peak, Mount Ballard, Jack Mountain, Crater Mountain, Monument Peak, Robinson Mountain, and many others from the tower.

Climate

Most weather fronts originate in the Pacific Ocean, and travel northeast toward the Cascade Mountains. As fronts approach the North Cascades, they are forced upward by the peaks of the Cascade Range, causing them to drop their moisture in the form of rain or snowfall onto the Cascades (Orographic lift). As a result, the west side of the North Cascades experiences higher precipitation than the east side, especially during the winter months in the form of snowfall. During winter months, weather is usually cloudy, but, due to high pressure systems over the Pacific Ocean that intensify during summer months, there is often little or no cloud cover during the summer. July through September are the best months to visit in terms of favorable weather and the Forest Service access road being open for the season, however, smoke from distant wildfires may potentially reduce visibility, and smoky summer conditions have been increasing with climate change.

Geology

The North Cascades features some of the most rugged topography in the Cascade Range with craggy peaks, spires, ridges, and deep glacial valleys. Geological events occurring many years ago created the diverse topography and drastic elevation changes over the Cascade Range leading to the various climate differences.

The history of the formation of the Cascade Mountains dates back millions of years ago to the late Eocene Epoch. With the North American Plate overriding the Pacific Plate, episodes of volcanic igneous activity persisted. In addition, small fragments of the oceanic and continental lithosphere called terranes created the North Cascades about 50 million years ago.

During the Pleistocene period dating back over two million years ago, glaciation advancing and retreating repeatedly scoured the landscape leaving deposits of rock debris. The "U"-shaped cross section of the river valleys are a result of recent glaciation. Uplift and faulting in combination with glaciation have been the dominant processes which have created the tall peaks and deep valleys of the North Cascades area.

See also

Geography of the North Cascades
Geology of the Pacific Northwest

References

External links

 Weather forecast: Slate Peak
 Slate Peak Trailhead: US Forest Service
 Slate Peak aerial photo: PBase

North Cascades
Mountains of Washington (state)
Mountains of Okanogan County, Washington
Mountains of Whatcom County, Washington
Cascade Range
Fire lookout towers in Washington (state)
North American 2000 m summits